Amrit Singh may refer to:

Amrit Singh (cyclist) (born 1991), Indian track cyclist
Amrit Singh, daughter of former Indian Prime Minister Manmohan Singh

See also 
Amritpal Singh (disambiguation)